Edgemont is a Canadian television series that aired from 2000 to 2004. Edgemont debuted January 4, 2000, on CBC Television and aired its final episode on July 21, 2004. There were a total of 70 episodes during its five-season run; the fifth season was shown commercial-free on the CBC. The series was created by Ian Weir, who also served as executive producer along with Michael Chechik. It was shot in the basement of the CBC Studios in Downtown Vancouver.

The 30-minute show delved into the lives of students at McKinley High School. The plots contained romance, intrigue, jealousy, and all the other elements associated with the adolescent and secondary school scene. The series also explored various social issues, such as racism and homosexuality.

Plot
The first season's plot centres on the relationship, and subsequent breakup, of Jen and Mark. Mark begins to pursue Laurel, and they begin a relationship in the second season. The relationship is rocky due to the very different goals of the two. Mark and Laurel eventually break off the relationship but attempt to remain friends.

There are also many subplots, such as Anika's manipulation of her classmates and friends, Craig's various well-intentioned but ill-fated social projects, Shannon's sexuality crisis, the divorce of Mark, Travis, and Kat's parents, and the rise and fall of Chris's popularity. Many social issues, such as prejudice, divorce, sexuality, and teen pregnancy, are dealt with during the run of the series.

Episodes

Cast

Main

Dominic Zamprogna as Mark Deosdade
Sarah Lind as Jen MacMahon
Kristin Kreuk as Laurel Yeung
P.J. Prinsloo as Chris Laidlaw
Myles Ferguson as Scott Linton (season 1)
Micah Gardener as Craig Woodbridge
Elana Nep as Erin Woodbridge
Grace Park as Shannon Ng
Vanessa King as Anika Nedeau

Richard Kahan as Gil Kurvers (recurring, season 1; main, seasons 2–5)
Meghan Black as Kat Deosdade (recurring, season 1; main, seasons 2–4)
Daniella Evangelista as Tracey Antonelli (recurring, season 1; seasons 2–5)

Chas Harrison as Kevin Michelsen (recurring, seasons 2–3; main, seasons 4–5)
Chiara Zanni as Maggie Buckman (recurring, seasons 1–4; main, season 5)
Jessica Lucas as Bekka Lawrence (recurring, seasons 2–3; main, seasons 4–5)

Recurring
James Kirk as Travis Deosdade
Chelan Simmons as Crystal (seasons 1–3)
Nicole Leier as Kelsey Laidlaw (seasons 1–4)
Andrew Robb as Wayne Litvack (seasons 3–5)
John Henry Reardon as Josh Wyatt (seasons 3–5)
Sarah Edmondson as Stevie (seasons 4–5)
Adrian Petriw as Mitch Leckie (seasons 4–5)
Britt Irvin as Paige Leckie (season 4)
Vikki Krinsky as Shelby Derouche (season 4)

Reception

Ratings
According to show creator Peter Weir, when Edgemont premiered three-quarters of its audience was over the age of 18, and even in its second season approximately half of the audience remained over 18 years of age. Second season episodes averaged approximately 300,000 Canadian viewers.

Critical
Edgemont received generally favorable reviews from The Globe and Mail critics John Doyle and Grant McIntyre.

Broadcast
Edgemont aired on CBC in Canada from 2000 to 2004. The program became moderately successful in Canada, including Quebec where the series was dubbed in French.

In the United States, the series originally aired on Fox Family Channel from January to August 2001, before being removed after completing the first season. The show eventually moved to WAM! starting in June 2005, which aired the series in its entirety. Edgemont later aired on TeenNick from 2009 to 2012, and also aired in syndication on the Fox, MyNetworkTV and The CW affiliates and on Sunday mornings on MeTV from 2012 to 2014 as part of the network's E/I-mandated programming. The series has been streamed online on Hulu.

Edgemont also aired in several other countries, including France.

Home media
A very limited release of the complete series on DVD was offered in 2005 on a cost recovery basis from the official website. It is estimated that between 200 and 300 copies were produced. It was announced on the official website on May 25, 2006, that the DVDs had sold out.

Streaming

As of 2018, the series has begun streaming for free on Canada Media Fund's Encore+ YouTube channel, which as of November 30th, 2022, has ceased operations.

See also

Notes

References

Inline sources

Other sources

External links
 
 Edgemont at the TV IV

2001 Canadian television series debuts
2005 Canadian television series endings
Canadian television soap operas
CBC Television original programming
2000s Canadian teen drama television series
2000s Canadian high school television series
Television shows set in Vancouver
Television series about teenagers
2000s Canadian LGBT-related drama television series
Television shows set in British Columbia
Television shows filmed in Vancouver